Mikael Karl Tellqvist (born September 19, 1979) is a Swedish former professional ice hockey goaltender who last played for Djurgårdens IF of the Swedish Hockey League, his second tenure with the club.

Playing career 
Tellqvist was drafted 70th overall by the Toronto Maple Leafs in the 2000 NHL Entry Draft. He had played a total of 14 games for the Leafs before the 2005–06 season, spending most of his time with their then American Hockey League (AHL) affiliate, the St. John's Maple Leafs.

In 2003, Tellqvist played in the world hockey championship. Here is where he represented Sweden. During this time he recorded a	1.37 goals against average  and a .940 save percentage. But unfortunately the run came to an end when they played Canada in the finals. They would lose and capture silver.

At the end of the 2005–06 season, when starting Maple Leafs goaltender Ed Belfour was injured, Tellqvist played in two consecutive games against the Montreal Canadiens when the Leafs were struggling to make the playoffs near the end of the season. He struggled in those games, letting in 11 total goals. Following the second game, he was replaced by Toronto's third-string goaltender, Jean-Sébastien Aubin.

On November 28, 2006, Tellqvist was traded to the Phoenix Coyotes in exchange for forward Tyson Nash and a fourth-round draft pick in 2007 NHL Entry Draft. Later in the season, on February 16, 2007, the Coyotes signed him to a contract extension through to the 2007–08 season. On March 12, 2007, in a game against the Philadelphia Flyers, he stopped all 24 shots to record his fourth career NHL shutout. On April 3, 2007, he set a new career high in wins with 11.

For the 2007–08 season, Tellqvist competed for Phoenix's starting goaltender position with Alex Auld and David Aebischer. Aebischer was eventually waived, setting up the tandem of Tellqvist and Auld. Upon the acquisition of Ilya Bryzgalov via waivers from the Anaheim Ducks, Auld was eventually traded to the Boston Bruins; Tellqvist became the back-up behind Bryzgalov.

On March 4, 2009, Tellqvist was traded by the Coyotes to the Buffalo Sabres in exchange for a fourth-round draft pick in 2010. On May 1, 2009, Tellqvist signed with Ak Bars Kazan of the Kontinental Hockey League (KHL) for the 2009–10 season.

On November 19, 2009, Tellqvist was traded to Lukko in the Finnish SM-liiga. Lukko was at the time leading the League by 18 points, and is one of the leading candidates for the championship.

On August 4, 2010, it was announced that Tellqvist has signed with Dinamo Riga of the KHL for the 2010–11 season.

On November 2, 2017, Tellqvist officially announced his retirement as a player.

Career statistics

Regular season and playoffs

References

External links 
Unofficial fan site of Mikael Tellqvist

1979 births
Living people
Ak Bars Kazan players
Buffalo Sabres players
Dinamo Riga players
Djurgårdens IF Hockey players
Expatriate ice hockey players in Russia
Huddinge IK players
Ice hockey players at the 2006 Winter Olympics
Lukko players
Medalists at the 2006 Winter Olympics
Modo Hockey players
Olympic gold medalists for Sweden
Olympic ice hockey players of Sweden
Olympic medalists in ice hockey
People from Sundbyberg Municipality
Phoenix Coyotes players
St. John's Maple Leafs players
Swedish expatriate ice hockey players in Canada
Swedish expatriate sportspeople in Latvia
Swedish expatriate sportspeople in Russia
Swedish expatriate ice hockey players in the United States
Swedish ice hockey goaltenders
Toronto Maple Leafs draft picks
Toronto Maple Leafs players
Toronto Marlies players
Sportspeople from Stockholm County